The Operational Land Forces Support Command (COMFOTER SPT) is a major subdivision of the Italian Army tasked with providing support resources to the Operational Land Forces Command.

History 
The Operational Land Forces Support Command was established on 1 October 2016, after the splitting of the Operational Land Forces Command in the Operational Land Forces Command - Army Operational Command (COMFOTER - COE) and in the Operational Land Forces Support Command itself.

The Operational Land Forces Support Command was established in accordance to the 2013 Revision Plan of the Ground Military Instrument of the Army Staff. The Revision Plan gave to COMFOTER SPT a chain of command independent from the Operational Forces Command, by upgrading the former Supports Command of the Land Operational Forces and placing the newly established COMFOTER SPT directly under the Chief of Staff of the Italian Army.

Commanders 
In its various configurations, the Operational Land Forces Support Command has had a total of ten Commanders:

Commanders of the Operational Land Forces Command
 Ten. Gen. Alberto Ficuciello (2001 - 2003);
 Ten. Gen. Antonio Quintana (2003 - 2003);
 Gen. C.A. Cosimo D'Arrigo (2003 - 2005);
 Gen. C.A. Bruno Iob (2005 - 2008);
 Gen. C.A. Armando Novelli (2008 - 2010);
 Gen. C.A. Francesco Tarricone (2010 - 2012);
 Gen. C.A. Roberto Bernardini (2012 - 2014);
 Gen. C.A. Alberto Primicerj (2014 - 2016).

Commanders of the Operational Land Forces Support Command:
 Gen. C.A. Amedeo Sperotto (2016 - 2018);
 Gen. C.A. Giuseppenicola Tota (2018–present).

Mission 
The Operational Land Forces Support Command is a management, coordination and control body of the tactical and logistic support Commands and Units of the Italian Army. The Command is also responsible for the preparation of these Units and Commands, subject to an operational use both nationally and internationally.

While not hierarchically subordinate to the Operational Land Forces Command, the Operational Land Forces Support Command follows policy guidelines issued by the Operational Land Forces Command for preparation, training and preparedness of support Commands and Units.

Organization 

The Operational Land Forces Support Command directly depends on the Chief of Staff of the Italian Army and is based in Verona. The Commander makes use of several subordinate bodies to direct the complex of activities entrusted and the subordinate units and commands:
 Commander area;
 Office of the Commanding General;
 Administration Office;
 Chief of Staff - Coordination Section of the General Staff;
 Planning, Programming and Budget Office;
 Legal affairs Office;
 Plans and Situation Office;
 Training Office;
 Security Office;
 Personnel Office;
 Logistic Office;
 General Affairs Office;
 Studies, Regulations and Lessons Learned Office;
 Command Unit.
The Command controls a total of approximately 16,000 troops.

Organization 

As of 2022 the Operational Land Forces Support Command consists of the following six commands at brigade-level:
  Artillery Command (Bracciano)
  Anti-aircraft Artillery Command (Sabaudia)
  Engineer Command (Rome)
  Signal Command (Rome)
  Tactical Intelligence Brigade (Anzio)

See also 
 Structure of the Italian Army
 Military aid to the civil power
 Operational Land Forces Command

References 

Army units and formations of Italy
Military units and formations established in 2016